Clip fonts or split fonts are non-Unicode fonts that assign glyphs of Brahmic scripts, such as Devanagari, at code positions intended for glyphs of the Latin script or to produce glyphs not found in Unicode by using its Private Use Area (PUA).

Comparison

Brahmic scripts have an inherent vowel without attached diacritics. Vowels (excluding the inherent vowel) that immediately follow a consonant are written as a diacritic. For example, a Devanagari consonant in ‘base form’ in Unicode is ‘घ’ /ɡʱə/ where the inherent vowel is ‘अ’ /ə/. If the vowel ‘आ’ /aː/ were to follow this Devanagari consonant, then the ‘ा’ diacritic is attached resulting in ‘घा’. Consonants that are a part of conjunct clusters may assume a conjunct form such as ‘घ्‍ ‘ in Devanagari.

Consonant–consonant clusters 
Devanagari consonants that are a part of conjunct clusters (except for the final consonant in a conjunct cluster, which is in its ‘base form’) are followed by the halant and zero-with joiner characters. For example, ‘घ्य’ /ɡʱjə/ is formed by ‘घ’, followed by the halant diacritic,

Clip fonts

Consonant–vowel clusters 
In clip fonts the ‘base form’ of a character is the conjunct form such as ‘घ्‍ ’ in Devanagari and diacritics are added to indicate that the consonant is immediately followed by a vowel (including the inherent vowel). For example, a Devanagari consonant in ‘base form’ in a clip font is ‘घ्‍ ’ /ɡʱ/. If the inherent vowel ‘अ’/ə/ were to follow this Devanagari consonant, then the ‘ा’ diacritic would be attached to it resulting in ‘घ’. Vowels that are not the inherent ‘अ’ /ə/ such as ‘आ’ /aː/ that follow this Devanagari consonant, then the ‘ा’ diacritic attaches twice, resulting in ‘घा’ with a Latin script representation of ‘Gaa’.

Consonant–consonant clusters 
Devanagari consonants that are a part of conjunct clusters are written consecutively in their ‘base forms’ (unless it is the last consonant in a conjunct cluster, which is in its ‘inherent vowel form’). For example, ‘घ्य’ /ɡʱjə/ is formed by ‘घ्‍ ’, followed by ‘य्‍ ’, and followed by the ‘ा’ diacritic with a Latin script representation of ‘Gya’.

Tables comparing Unicode and clip fonts

The ‘घा’ ligature

The ‘घ्य’ ligature

Latin script characters 
A computer assumes that text written with a clip font is in the Latin script. Thus, when the font is changed to another Latin script font that is not a clip font, the Latin script characters on the keys that were used to type the text are displayed instead of text in the original Brahmic script. As a result, the clip font has to be available wherever text in Brahmic script is desired. Thus, clip fonts may not be uniformly compatible across computers and the Internet. This weakness is used as a kind of encryption.

Purpose and availability
Clip fonts arose as a result of the perceived complexity of keyboard layout switching in common operating system setups, as well as defective internationalization capabilities in older software. English computer keyboards are common in India. Clip font users can easily write Hindi and other Indic languages using those keyboards. In India, people switch quickly among multiple languages and scripts.

At least 40 commercial clip fonts are available. With ASCII, they are used by custom keyboard drivers for Indic scripts, intended to limit keystrokes. Such helper software often broke following operating system updates.

One of the popular clip fonts for Devanagari is Kiran fonts KF-Kiran, because it does not require special software and can be used in older software. Many users successfully ported this True Type font to operating systems such as Mac OS, Linux, some flavours of Unix and Android.

Clip fonts are sometimes used for scripts that are not yet encoded in Unicode. The "correct" way to handle these is to temporarily encode these in Unicode's Private Use Area (PUA). Users in India find that only English language keyboards are available.

List of clip fonts

See also
 Indian Script Code for Information Interchange
 ISCII

References

External links
 Marathi and Hindi Calligraphy Fonts Free are available under the section titled ‘2. Marathi Font, Hindi calligraphy fonts free for personal use’
 10000+ Marathi Fonts Download Free are available under the section titled ‘1. Legacy Hindi Font’
 Hindi
 Devanagari clip fonts are available under the section titled ‘2. Marathi Typing Font’
 Devanagari clip fonts are available under the section titled ‘1. Legacy Hindi Font’

Devanagari typography
Indic computing
Clip fonts